Fatty acid-binding protein 2 (FABP2) also known as Intestinal-type fatty acid-binding protein (I-FABP) is a protein that in humans is encoded by the FABP2 gene.

Function 

The intracellular fatty acid-binding proteins (FABPs) belong to a multigene family with nearly twenty identified members. FABPs are divided into at least three distinct types, namely the hepatic-, intestinal- and cardiac-type. They form 14-15 kDa proteins and are thought to participate in the uptake, intracellular metabolism and/or transport of long-chain fatty acids. They may also be responsible in the modulation of cell growth and proliferation. Intestinal fatty acid-binding protein 2 gene contains four exons and is an abundant cytosolic protein in small intestine epithelial cells.

Clinical significance 

This gene has a polymorphism at codon 54 that identified an alanine-encoding allele and a threonine-encoding allele. Thr-54 protein is associated with increased fat oxidation and insulin resistance.

References

Further reading

Obesity